The Ministry of Internal Affairs is the Armenian government ministry which oversees the Police of Armenia, the Migration and Citizenship Service, and the Rescue Service. The Ministry is headed by the Minister of Internal Affairs, appointed by the decree of the Prime Minister of Armenia. The minister in charge has been Vahe Ghazaryan since 9 January 2023.

History

First ministry 
On 21 June 1992, President Levon Ter-Petrosyan created the Ministry of Internal Affairs from the former Soviet Armenian Interior Ministry and the Soviet Internal Troops. It operated until December 2002, when the ministry was reorganized into the Police of Armenia.

Reformation 
In 2019, the Ministry of Justice recommended the re-establishment of the ministry as part of the government's three-year strategy of police reforms. In 2021, Prime Minister Nikol Pashinian announced plans to recreate the Interior Ministry.

On 24 November 2022, during a regular Cabinet meeting chaired by Pashinyan a draft law on the reestablishment of the Ministry of Internal Affairs was adopted, with the Ministry of Emergency Situations ceasing its activities according to the transition schedule. In December, the National Assembly of Armenia approved a government proposal to set up the ministry. Pashinyan noted that the purpose of the creation of the interior ministry was aimed at “increasing the effectiveness of the work of the police” and the move was supported by members of parliament, one of whom said that it would increase “democratic oversight” of the police.

List of Ministers

See also 

 Law enforcement in Armenia
 Ministry of Internal Affairs (Artsakh)

References 

Ministries established in 1992
Internal affairs ministries
Ministries established in 2022
Government ministries of Armenia
Law enforcement in Armenia